The Wayside Inn Historic District is a historic district on Old Boston Post Road in Sudbury, Massachusetts. The district contains the Wayside Inn, a historic landmark that is one of the oldest inns in the country, operating as Howe's Tavern in 1716. The district features Greek Revival and American colonial architecture.  The area was added to the National Register of Historic Places in 1973.

The Wayside Inn

Other structures

Henry Ford built a replica and fully working grist mill and a white non-denominational chapel, named after his mother, Mary, and mother-in-law, Martha. Less well known is Ford's attempt to create a reservoir for the Wayside Inn. Across US Rte. 20 and now secluded in a wooded area behind private homes is a 30 ft. high stone dam. Dubbed by the locals as "Ford's Folly" the structure failed to retain water because the feeding brook provided insufficient volume and the ground was too porous for a pond to fill.

In the grounds of the chapel stands the Redstone School, a one-room schoolhouse which was moved from its original location in Sterling, Massachusetts, by Ford, who believed the building was the actual schoolhouse mentioned in Sarah Josepha Hale's poem "Mary Had a Little Lamb".

Gallery

See also
National Register of Historic Places listings in Middlesex County, Massachusetts

References

External links
 
 At archive.org, the listing for the so-called "Front door diaries"

Sudbury, Massachusetts
Historic districts on the National Register of Historic Places in Massachusetts
Historic districts in Middlesex County, Massachusetts
National Register of Historic Places in Middlesex County, Massachusetts
Tourist attractions in Middlesex County, Massachusetts
Open-air museums in Massachusetts